Denise Zimba (born 10 November 1988) is a South African actress, singer, dancer and presenter, most known for her role as Mary Gumede in the soap opera Generations: The Legacy. She also joined Vuzu's flagship daily entertainment show V-Entertainment in 2013.

Filmography

Discography

Studio EP
 Rude

References

External link

1988 births
Living people
South African actresses
Place of birth missing (living people)

South African dancers